Sadabad-e Amlak (also Romanized as Sa‘dābād-e Amlāk; also known as Sa‘dābād) is a village in Behnamvasat-e Shomali Rural District, in the Central District of Varamin County, Tehran Province, Iran. At the 2006 census, its population was 220, in 58 families.

References 

Populated places in Varamin County